Bohai Train Ferry is a train ferry service connecting Dalian, Liaoning and Yantai, Shandong in China over the Bohai Sea, which is the northern part of the Yellow Sea.

General 
Some ideas of crossing the Yellow Sea from the Shandong Peninsula to the Liaodong Peninsula by means of other than the ships, such as the bridges or undersea tunnels, have been discussed in the history of China, particularly since the late 19th century when many people moved to Northeast China in the Chuang Guandong population move and the Beiyang Fleet was stationed in Weihaiwei, Shandong, and Lushun, Liaoning.  However, as a more practical plan, Bohai Train Ferry was approved at the national level in December 2003; its construction being started in full swing in October 2004, its test operation in November 2006, and its full operation in 2007. It is the second oceanic train ferry in China after the Guangdong–Hainan Ferry (part of the Guangdong–Hainan Railway) and is the longest train ferry in the country.

Bohai Train Ferry travels .  Currently, there are six daily services (Dalian-Yantai: 09:30-16:00, 16:30-23:00 and 23:20-06:20; Yantai-Dalian: 05:20-11:50, 14:10-20:40 and 22:00-04:30; as of August, 2009) by three vessels: the Sinorail Bohai No. 1, No. 2 and No. 3, each accommodating up to 50 railway freight cars, 50 twenty-ton trucks, 25 passenger cars and 400 passengers.

New branch line of the Dalian-Lushun railway and new highway branch were made that connect to this railway ferry.  The ferry is in the northernmost part of the newly developed area on Yangtou Bay of the Bohai Sea that includes World Peace Park, the new development zone and the universities (the Software and Information Engineering Departments of Dalian Jiaotong University and Dalian University of Foreign Economy and Trade). Plans for a tunnel across the Bohai strait have been developed.

Lüshun West Station

The railway terminal on the Dalian side of Bohai Train Ferry is newly named as Lüshun West Station.  There are no platforms because no passenger trains pass through.  There is a four-storey station building where the passengers can buy tickets on the first floor and go up to the second floor to enter the vessel through a concourse.

Competition
 Dalian Port Ferries: Dalian-Yantai and Dalian-Weihai
 Railway: Dalian-Jinzhou-Tangshan-Jinan
 Airline: Dalian-Yantai

See also
 Dalian
 Lushun
 Yantai
 Bohai Strait Tunnel, a proposed project

References

External links
 Official site of Bohai Train Ferry Co., Ltd. 

Ferries of China
Transport in Dalian
Transport in Shandong